Tolgabide (INN; development code SL-81.0142) is a drug which was patented by Synthélabo as an anticonvulsant but was never marketed. It is an analogue of progabide and acts similarly to it as a prodrug of GABA, and therefore as an indirect agonist of the GABA receptors.

See also 
 Progabide
 Fengabine

References 

Anticonvulsants
Chloroarenes
Phenols
Carboxamides
GABA analogues
GABAA receptor agonists
GABAA-rho receptor agonists
GABAB receptor agonists
Prodrugs
Abandoned drugs